Igreja da Graça is an old church and convent in Évora, Portugal. Currently this convent is used by the Portuguese Armed Forces.

Its construction was concluded in 1511 and it is now classified as a National Monument, and it is an integral part of Évora's old city centre, which is classified as a UNESCO World Heritage Site.

Nossa Senhora Graca
National monuments in Évora District